Robert Ryman (May 30, 1930February 8, 2019) was an American painter identified with the movements of monochrome painting, minimalism, and conceptual art. He was best known for abstract, white-on-white paintings. He lived and worked in New York City.

Life and career
Ryman was born in Nashville, Tennessee. After studying saxophone at the Tennessee Polytechnic Institute in Cookeville, between 1948 and 1949, and at the George Peabody College for Teachers between 1949 and 1950, Ryman enlisted in the United States army reserve corps and was assigned to an army reserve band during the Korean War. Ryman moved to New York City in 1953, intending to become a professional jazz saxophonist. He had lessons with pianist Lennie Tristano, which later informed his painting. At that time he was renting a room in the home of a Russian cello player. Ryman soon took a day job at the Museum of Modern Art as a security guard to make ends meet, and met the artists Sol LeWitt and Dan Flavin, who were co-workers with him at MoMA. Immediately after quitting his job at MoMA, Ryman spent the next year working in the art division of the New York Public Library. He also met artist Roy Lichtenstein during this period of the 1950s.

Captivated by the newly acquired abstract expressionist works of Mark Rothko, Willem de Kooning, Clyfford Still, Jackson Pollock and Barnett Newman, Ryman became curious about the act of painting. From 1953 to 1960, he worked at the MoMA as a guard in order to be close to painting. He purchased some art supplies at a local store and began experimenting in his apartment in 1953.

Ryman had a close relationship with the late conservator Orrin Riley, who would frequently give him advice on archival materials, many times testing the acidity of media the artist was interested in using. He was interviewed by the television writer and producer Barbaralee Diamonstein twice, once for the book and video production Inside New York's Art World in 1979 and again for Inside the Art World in 1994.

In 2009 he participated in the art project Find Me, by Gema Alava, in company of artists Lawrence Weiner, Merrill Wagner and Paul Kos.

His most famous quote is "There is never any question of what to paint only how to paint."

In 1961 the artist married art historian Lucy Lippard. They had a son together, Ethan Ryman, in 1964, who was first a sound engineer and now an artist. The marriage ended in divorce. In 1969 he married artist Merrill Wagner. Robert Ryman's sons from his second marriage, Cordy Ryman and Will Ryman, are also artists and currently work in New York City.

Ryman died on February 8, 2019, at the age of 88.

Work

Painting
Ryman was often classified as a minimalist; but, he preferred to be known as a "realist", because, he was not interested in creating illusions, but, only in presenting the materials he used in compositions at their face value. As he wrote in a statement for a 2010 exhibition at Pace Wildenstein, "I am not a picture painter. I work with real light and space, and since real light is an important aspect of the paintings, it always presents some problems." The majority of his works feature abstract expressionist-influenced brushwork in white or off-white paint on square canvas or metal surfaces. A lifelong experimenter with media, Ryman painted and/or drew on canvas, linen, steel, aluminum, plexiglas, lumasite, vinyl, fiberglass, corrugated paper, burlap, newsprint, wallpaper, jute sacking, fiberplate, a composite material called gator board, feather board, handmade paper, and acrilivin. He used painted and/or drew with oil, acrylic, encaustic, Lascaux acrylic, casein, enamel, pastel, oil pastel, graphite, guache, and enamelac.

By the time Ryman began working, older artists like Barnett Newman, Mark Rothko, and Philip Guston had already reduced painting to its essences. In 1955 Ryman began what he considered to be his earliest professional work, a largely monochrome painting titled Orange Painting (1955–59). In 1968-69 he created his Classico series of compositions consisting of multi-panel paintings on a specific type of paper called Classico. For each work in the series, Ryman attached a configuration of heavy, creamy white sheets of the paper to a wall with masking tape, painted the sheets with a shiny white acrylic paint, removed the tape when the sheets were dry, mounted them on foamcore, and reattached them to the wall. The built-up paint edge tracing the outline of masking tape and the ripped paper left behind give witness to the process of creation. The various works in the Classico series differ in the organization of paper sheets, the configuration of tape traces, and the painted shape. Just as the Classico works were titled after the type of paper used as a medium, the so-called Surface Veil works from 1970 were named for the brand of fiberglass upon which the smaller pieces in this group were painted. Some of the 12-foot square paintings from the series were executed not on fiber-glass but on cotton or linen. In each of these works the pigment appears to form a membrane over the support due to the differing degrees of opacity and translucence in the white paint juxtaposed with areas where less of it has been applied, leaving the fabric exposed. These disruptions in the painting’s skin often mark the literal pauses between the artist’s working sessions.

From around 1975 until 2003, Ryman often affixed his paintings to the wall with metal brackets. He would design each set of brackets specifically for each piece and have them constructed by a local metals fabricator.

Prints and Drawings
Although Ryman is most known for his paintings, he also experimented with printmaking creating etchings, aquatints, lithographs, silkscreens and relief prints. Like his paintings, his prints are readily identifiable by their predominantly square monochromatic surfaces exploring the values, textures and effects of various whites and other colors printed on paper and aluminum.

His prints and works on paper, have not yet been given the same attention, but his approach to making prints and drawings is the same. Working with the particular characteristics of each medium and process, Ryman, from 1969 onwards, explored new territory of making editions, all with a minimum of materials. In his printmaking, Ryman sought to control the texture of his surfaces in ways that he would continue to explore for the rest of his career. As in his paintings, his prints require viewers to pay attention, look closely and observe subtleties. Ryman’s prints both challenge a viewer and reward close looking.

He stated that his titles were meaningless, and that they only existed as a form of identification. Ryman actually preferred the term of "name" for an artwork instead of a title because he was not creating a picture or making reference to anything except the media and the materials. The "names" of his works often come from the names of art supplies, companies, or are just general words that do not carry specific connotation.

Exhibitions
Ryman had his first solo show at Paul Bianchini's gallery, New York City, in 1967 at the age of 36; his first show in Europe came the following year at the Galerie Heiner Friedrich, Munich. One year later, Ryman was included in When Attitudes Become Form, a seminal exhibition of works by Minimalist and Conceptual artists organized by the Kunsthalle Bern. His first solo show at a museum was in 1972 at the Guggenheim Museum in New York City, displaying thirty-eight of Ryman’s works from 1965 to 1971. Ryman's works were represented in documentas 5 (1972), 6 (1977), and 7 (1982), in Kassel, in the Venice Biennale (1976, 1978, 1980 and 2007), and in the Whitney Biennial (1977, 1987, 1995). His first retrospective was organized by the Stedelijk Museum, Amsterdam, in 1974. In 1993-94, the largest retrospective to date of Ryman's paintings, curated by Robert Storr, was exhibited at the Tate Gallery, Museo Nacional Centro de Arte Reina Sofia in Madrid, the Museum of Modern Art in New York, the San Francisco Museum of Modern Art, and the Walker Art Center in Minneapolis.

Robert Ryman is represented by David Zwirner.

Collections
The Hallen für Neue Kunst, a former contemporary art museum in Schaffhausen, Switzerland (closed in 2014) had the largest public collection of Ryman's work, permanently exhibiting 29 pieces created from 1959 to 2007. In 2008 Ryman undertook a major reinstallation of his galleries at Hallen für Neue Kunst. Returning to the museum in 2008 — for the first time in 12 years — to revisit the permanent exhibition of his work that was first installed in 1983, he decided to transform the galleries into a “Gesamtkunstwerk” — a synthesis, or total experience, composed of 32 paintings from 50 years of work.

In 2017, Ryman donated 21 painting to the Dia Art Foundation’s permanent collection, making it the only site with an extensive permanent grouping, featuring works made as early as the late 1950s and continuing up to 2003. Other major museums collecting his works include the Museum of Modern Art, New York; the Tate, London; the Art Institute of Chicago and the Stedelijk Museum in Amsterdam.

Recognition and reception
A recipient of numerous honors, Ryman was awarded a John Simon Guggenheim Foundation Scholarship (1973), the Skowhegan Medal from the Skowhegan School of Painting and Sculpture (1985). He was a member of the American Academy of Arts and Letters after 1994, and assumed the role of the organization’s Vice President in 2003.

In 2005, Ryman was awarded the Praemium Imperiale.

2009 saw the publication of Robert Ryman: Critical Texts Since 1967, edited by Vittorio Colaizzi and Karsten Schubert and published by Ridinghouse. The book charts the gradual evolution of the reception of and reaction to Ryman’s art. A comprehensive selection of over 60 essays and exhibition reviews has been collated into one volume, including texts by some of the most influential art historians and critics of their time; Yve-Alain Bois, Donald B. Kuspit, Lucy R. Lippard, Robert Storr and others.

Ryman's painting Bridge (1980) sold for $20.6 million at a Christie's auction in 2015.

Literature
 Waldman, Diane. Robert Ryman. New York: Solomon R. Guggenheim Museum, 1972.
 Robert Ryman. Amsterdam: Stedelijk Museum, 1974. Text by Naomi Spector.
 Robert Ryman. London: Whitechapel Art Gallery, 1977. Text by Naomi Spector. Statement by Robert Ryman.
 Robert Ryman. Zürich: Halle für international neue Kunst, 1980. Texts by Urs Rausmüller and Christel Sauer.
 Robert Ryman. Paris: Centre Georges Pompidou, Musée national d'arte moderne, 1981. Texts by Dominique Bozo, Yve-Alain Bois and Christel Sauer.
 Storr, Robert. "Robert Ryman: Making Distinctions." Art in America 74, no. 6 (June 1986), pp. 92–97.
 Robert Ryman. New York: Dia Art Foundation, 1988. Text by Charles Wright; interview by Gary Garrels; technical discussion of new paintings by Garrels and Ryman; selected artist's statements and excerpts from interviews.
 Christel Sauer, Urs Raussmüller (Hrsg.): Robert Ryman, Schaffhausen 1991, 
 Christel Sauer, Urs Raussmüller (Hrsg.): Robert Ryman: Versions, Schaffhausen 1992, 
 Storr, Robert. Robert Ryman. London: Tate Gallery; New York: Museum of Modern Art, 1993 
 Sandback, Amy Baker. Robert Ryman Prints, 1969-1993. New York: Parasol Press, Ltd., 1993.
 Yve-Alain Bois, Ryman's Tact, Painting as Model. Cambridge, MA/London: MIT Press, 1995.
 Robert Ryman Retrospektive mit Räumen von Ariane Epars, Clay Ketter, Albert Weis und Beat Zoderer. Munich: Haus der Kunst; Bonn: Kunstmuseum; Ostfildern: Edition Tertium, 2000.
 Buren, Daniel. L'Ineffable, à propos de l'oeuvre de Ryman/The Ineffable, About Ryman's Work. Paris: Wide Open, Editions Jannink, 2000. 
 Robert Ryman. Sakura City, Japan: Kawamura Memorial Museum of Art, 2004. Text by Robert Ryman.
 Wylie, Charles. Robert Ryman. Dallas: Dallas Museum of Art; New Haven and London: Yale University Press, 2005. 
 Christel Sauer (Hrsg.): Urs Raussmüller: Ryman Paintings and Ryman Exhibitions, Raussmüller Collection, Frauenfeld/Basel 2006, 
 Christel Sauer (Hrsg.): Robert Ryman at Inverleith House Royal Botanic Garden Edinburgh, Raussmüller Collection, Frauenfeld/Basel 2006, 
 Jean Frémon: The Paradoxes of Robert Ryman, Black Square editions, The Brooklyn Rail, New York, 2008
 Suzanne Hudson, Robert Ryman: Used Paint. Cambridge, MA: MIT Press, 2009. 
 Robert Ryman: Critical Texts Since 1967, edited by Vittorio Colaizzi and Karsten Schubert. Ridinghouse, London 2009.
 Storr, Robert. Interview with Robert Ryman. November 23, 2010. Excerpts published in: Pietropaolo, Francesca, ed. Robert Storr: Interviews on Art. London: Heni Publishing, 2017, pp. 773–74.
 Christel Sauer (Hrsg.): Robert Ryman and Urs Raussmüller: Advancing the Experience Hallen für Neue Kunst, Schaffhausen, Raussmüller Collection, Basel 2010, 
 Robert Ryman, edited by Stephen Hoban and Courtney J. Martin. New York: Dia Art Foundation, 2017. 
'Vittorio Colaizzi, Robert Ryman, Phaidon Press, September 4, 2017'
 Robert Ryman. Les Cahiers de la Collection Lambert. Arles: Actes Sud, 2020. Texts by Alain Lombard and Stéphane Ibars.

References

External links 
The Pace Gallery
Biography, interviews, essays, artwork images and video clips from PBS series Art:21 -- Art in the Twenty-First Century  - Season 4 (2007).
 Robert Ryman - the Guggenheim Museum
Robert Ryman at Xavier Hufkens, Brussels

1930 births
2019 deaths
20th-century American painters
American male painters
21st-century American painters
American abstract artists
Minimalist artists
Painters from Tennessee
Members of the American Academy of Arts and Letters
People from Nashville, Tennessee
Security guards
20th-century American printmakers
20th-century American male artists